No. 657 Squadron AAC was a squadron of the British Army's Army Air Corps (AAC), part of the Joint Special Forces Aviation Wing based at RAF Odiham. The squadron disbanded in May 2018 after the retirement of the Westland Lynx.

History
No. 657 Squadron traces it lineage to the Royal Air Force No. 657 Squadron formed in January 1943 and disbanded in November 1955.

No. 657 Squadron AAC was formed on 1 January 1973 as part of 1 Regiment AAC. The squadron served in Northern Ireland based at Shackleton Barracks. On 1 March 1978, No. 665 Squadron AAC was re-designated as 657 Squadron based at Kirkee Barracks in Colchester. In July 1990, the squadron relinquished its independent status by becoming part of 9 Regiment AAC and moved to Oakington in Cambridgeshire and then in February 1991 to Dishforth Airfield in North Yorkshire.

In June 2000, the squadron once again became independent when it moved to RAF Odiham in Hampshire. In September 2000, two Westland Lynx helicopters took part in Operation Barras in Sierra Leone. In April 2001, the squadron became part of the newly formed Joint Special Forces Aviation Wing.

Afghanistan incident
On 26 April 2014, a Lynx crashed in Takhta Pul district of Kandahar Province, killing all five British personnel on board. They were Captain Thomas Clarke, Warrant Officer 2 Spencer Faulkner and Corporal James Walters of the Army Air Corps, Flight Lieutenant Rakesh Chauhan of the Royal Air Force and Lance Corporal Oliver Thomas of the Intelligence Corps. As at 28 April 2014, the cause was described as an "accident", despite Taliban claims that they had caused the crash. The purpose of the mission has speculated upon, but has been described as a "routine training mission". The site, variously described as "close to Kandahar base" and "30 miles from the Pakistani border", had been "secured" for recovery of the bodies and aircraft.

A full report into the accident was published in July 2015, by the Ministry of Defence and the Military Aviation Authority.

Disbandment 
With the Lynx reaching the end of its operational life in January 2018, the squadron disbanded in May 2018. 

Plans to purchase modified AgustaWestland Wildcat helicopters to replace the Lynx in the special forces role were dropped due to budget constraints. The squadron's special forces role has therefore been taken over by a flight of special forces-trained personnel within the existing Wildcat fleet.

See also

 List of Army Air Corps aircraft units

References

Army Air Corps aircraft squadrons
Military units and formations established in 1973
Military units and formations disestablished in 2018